The Myrtle Beach Marathon is a marathon which takes place in Myrtle Beach, South Carolina. It is held annually on the first Saturday in March. 5,500 to 7,500 individuals participate in the race annually.  It is the largest marathon in South Carolina and was named one of the 'Top Ten Winter Marathons' by USA Today.

The marathon course, which the half marathon follows for the first 12.1 miles, has a maximum elevation of 19.98 ft and a total ascent of 110.02 ft.  The Myrtle Beach Marathon was ranked is the 8th most likely marathon to qualify for the Boston Marathon with 16.1% of the marathon field earning their ticket to Boston in 2016.

The race was moved from Washington's Birthday to March in 2016, and in 2017 became part of Raleigh, NC-based Capstone Events, which owns events such as the Bay to Breakers event.  The 2021 marathon was moved to May and became the first marathon in the state after the pandemic. The 24th Myrtle Beach Marathon will take place on March 5, 2022.

List of winners of the Myrtle Beach Marathon

Men's

Women's 

No race in 2010 (ice)

See also

 List of marathon races in North America

References

External links
 Official website
 Marathon Information

Marathons in the United States
Sports competitions in South Carolina
Sports in Myrtle Beach, South Carolina
March sporting events
Recurring sporting events established in 2000
2000 establishments in South Carolina